Francisco Javier Bravo Carbajal (born 18 February 1967) is a Mexican politician affiliated with the Institutional Revolutionary Party. He served as Deputy of the LIX Legislature of the Mexican Congress representing Jalisco, and previously served in the LV Legislature of the Congress of Jalisco.

References

1967 births
Living people
People from Puerto Vallarta
Institutional Revolutionary Party politicians
Politicians from Jalisco
University of Guadalajara alumni
Members of the Congress of Jalisco
21st-century Mexican politicians
Deputies of the LIX Legislature of Mexico
Members of the Chamber of Deputies (Mexico) for Jalisco